

People
Anita Lobel, Polish-American illustrator of children's books
Arnold Stark Lobel (1933–1987), American author of children's books
Bob Lobel, sportscaster for WBZ-TV in Boston, Massachusetts
Dory Lobel, musician, songwriter and producer
Edgar Lobel (1888-1982), papyrologist and editor of Greek lyric poetry
Baron Loicq de Lobel, proposed the Bering Strait crossing
Mary Lobel (1900-1993), English historian and wife of Edgar Lobel
Matthias de Lobel (1538–1616), (Mathias de l'Obel, Matthaeus Lobelius) studied medicine in Leuven and Montpellier
Mike Lobel (born 1984), Canadian actor
Ofir Lobel, one third of The Prozak Trio
Rob Lobel (born 1966) Canadian curler from Thornhill, Ontario

Products
Lobel's maple, Acer lobelii
Ulmus 'Lobel', Dutch hybrid cultivar
Lobel's of New York, a beef product company headquartered in Manhattan, New York City

See also
Löbel, a surname
Lobeline